Morning Light may refer to:

Books
 Morning Light, a 1930 novel by Frank Bird Linderman
 Morning Light: The Islanders in the Days of Oak and Hemp, 1946 book by H. M. Tomlinson 
 Morning Light, a 1976 book by French Catholic writer Jean Sulivan, winner of Prix Bretagne
 Morning Light, a 1998 book of poetry by Lee Harwood
 Morning Light, a 2008 novel by Catherine Anderson

Music
 The Morning Light. a pop rock band based in Pittsburgh, Pennsylvania

Albums
 Morning Light, a 1989 album by Debbie McClendon
 Morning Light, a 1997 album by Mark Van Hoen
 Morning Light: Songs To Awaken the Dawn, a 1999 album by Steve Green
 Morning Light, a 2003 album by Ananda Project
 Morning Light, a 2005 album by St. Louis Jesuits
 The Morning Light, a 2008 album by The Morning Light
 Morning Light, a 2015 album by Ivory Hours
 Morning Light, a 2019 album by Dayna Manning

Songs
 "Morning Light", a song by Lou Brown
 "Morning Light", a song by Jerry Ragovoy performed by Louis Jordan
 "Morning Light", a song by Sparkadia single from their 2008 debut album Postcards
 "Morning Light", title song of a 1977 EP by Rabbitt
 "Morning Light", a song by Girls from the 2009 album Album
 "Morning Light", a song by Eskimo Joe from the 2009 album Inshalla
 "Morning Light", a song by Ida Maria from the 2008 album Fortress Round My Heart
 "Morning Light", a song by Woods from the 2016 album City Sun Eater in the River of Light
 "Morning Light (feat. Na Na)", a song by E-type from the 1998 album Last Man Standing
 "Morning Light", a theme song for the BBC TV programme Gardeners' World
 "Morning Light", a song by Phil Keaggy from the 1982 album Play thru Me
 "Morning Light", a song by Inusa Dawuda
 "Morning Light", a song by Skinny
 "Morning Light", a 2013 single by Nu:Logic
 "A Morning Light", a song by John Zorn and performed by the Gnostic Trio from the 2013 album In Lambeth
 "Morning Light", a song by Justin Timberlake & Alicia Keys from his 2018 album Man of the Woods
 "Morning Light", a song by Doja Cat from the 2018 album Amala

Ships
 Morning Light (ship), a wooden sailing ship launched in 1856 and wrecked in 1889
 USS Morning Light (1853), a sailing ship acquired by the Union Navy during the American Civil War
 Morning Light, name of the training vessel in the documentary film of the same name
, a cargo liner in service 1969-73

Other uses
 Morning Light (film), a 2008 sailing documentary film directed by Mark Monroe and released on Walt Disney Pictures.
 Morning Light (Gruner), a 1916 painting by Australian artist Elioth Gruner
 'Morning Light', a cultivar of the grass Miscanthus sinensis

See also
 In the Morning Light (disambiguation)
 Operation Morning Light, an effort to recover radioactive material from the Russian satellite Kosmos 954
 Bewegung Morgenlicht (German for Dawn Movement or Morning Light Movement), a German militant, pretending to be a group, active in 2009–10
 Ha-Boker Or (The Morning Light), a Hebrew periodical published by Avrom Ber Gotlober
 Clipper Morning Light, a former name of the Boeing 747-121 aircraft on Pan Am Flight 103